Samantha Punch is a professor at Stirling University and a Scottish champion bridge player.

Career
Dr. Punch is a Professor of Sociology, Social Policy & Criminology at Stirling University.

Samantha has an H-index of 37.

Bridge accomplishments
Samantha grew up in England but moved to Scotland. She has represented Scotland on over twenty occasions. Her highest finish is fourth on the Scottish Women's Team at the World Championships in Wroclaw in 2016.

Bridge: A MindSport for All (BAMSA) 
Dr. Punch started BAMSA in 2013. BAMSA established a new academic discipline, the sociology of bridge.
BAMSA has three key goals:

 transform the image of bridge,
 encourage more people of all ages to play,
 to ensure the card game continues to thrive.

Personal life
Samantha lives in Scotland with her partner-in-life and Bridge partner, Stephen Peterkin.

Bibliography

Books 
Get Set for Sociology, McIntosh, I. and Punch, S.

Children's Food Practices in Families and Institutions, Punch, S., McIntosh, I. and Emond, R.

Sociology: Making Sense of Society, Fifth edition, Punch, S., Marsh, I., Keating, M. and Harden, J.

Children and Young People’s Relationships: Learning Across Majority and Minority Worlds, Punch, S. and Tisdall, K.

Families, Intergenerationality, and Peer Group Relations, Punch, S. and Vanderbeck, R.

Bridge at the Top: Behind the Screens

References

Scottish contract bridge players
Living people
Year of birth missing (living people)